Floyd Nathaniel Hills (born February 22, 1982), professionally known as Danja, is an American record producer and songwriter from Virginia Beach, Virginia. Starting off as a co-producer for Timbaland, he has since then created an extensive catalog of solo-produced singles. He has produced songs for artists such as Britney Spears, Usher, Keri Hilson, T.I., Nelly Furtado, Kevin Cossom, Ciara, Mariah Carey, Timbaland, Madonna, Whitney Houston, Missy Elliott, M.I.A., Justin Timberlake, JoJo, Joe Jonas, Simple Plan, The Clutch, Pink, T-Pain, Diddy, Meek Mill, Björk, Duran Duran and  AGNEZ MO.

Early life
Hills, born in Virginia Beach, Virginia, took up the drums and piano in his early teens. He got his start by playing in his church when he was growing up. In 2000, Hills worked with producer and singer Teddy Riley on Blackstreet's fourth album, Level II. In 2001, a chance encounter with Timbaland turned into an opportunity to play some music for him. Two years later, Timbaland brought Danja to Miami to work in his studio.

Career
With Timbaland, Hills produced a wide catalog of songs in 2006 with an ongoing string of hits throughout the year until present, including "Put You On The Game" by rapper The Game, "Promiscuous" and "Say It Right" by Nelly Furtado, "SexyBack", "What Goes Around...Comes Around" and "My Love" by Justin Timberlake among others, such as "Love Story" by Katharine McPhee, "Innocence" and "Earth Intruders" by Björk, and "Give It to Me" and "The Way I Are" off Timbaland's second solo album.

In 2007, Danja produced  "Gimme More" for Britney Spears, as well as "Break the Ice" and five other tracks for her Blackout album. The following year, he produced "Kill the Lights" and five other songs for Britney Spears' album Circus, but only three songs appeared on the album. Around this time, Danja was reported to be charging $50,000 - $100,000 per track.

His works in recent years include, Madonna, "4 Minutes", he also produced with Timbaland and Justin Timberlake other tracks from her 2008 album Hard Candy, Mariah Carey on her song "Migrate" from E=MC², Keri Hilson on her song "Knock You Down" from In a Perfect World..., P!nk on her song "Sober" from Funhouse.

Danja produced the song, Toy Soldier on the Keri Hilson album No Boys Allowed, "Freak" by Jamie Foxx, "The Writer" by Jesse McCartney, "Sleep When I'm Gone" by DJ Khaled for his upcoming album "We The Best Forever". Danja has also been in studio with rapper J. Cole working on his debut album Cole World.
 
Danja also produced 3 songs on Diddy - Dirty Money's Last Train To Paris. According to Danja's Twitter account, He was in studio with Mary J. Blige and Jay-Z. Danja is working with his artist Kevin Cossom for his debut, L.O.V.E. He produced the first single, "Baby I Like It" which features Fabolous and Diddy. He produced the single "Believe", as well as two leaks "Don't Leave Me Rose" and "Killer" by Travis Garland. He recently produced the song "Everything On Me" on T.I's latest album "No Mercy". Danja has also produced "Sexy to Me" by singer/songwriter Joanna Levesque, which is also featured on the singer's commercial for Clearasil.

Danja co-wrote and co-produced "Shining" by DJ Khaled featuring Jay-Z and Beyoncé which immediately hit number one on Billboard's Trending 140. The release is off DJ Khaled's upcoming project on Epic Records. Danja has upcoming cuts on Andy Grammer, Keyshia Cole, Jordan Fisher, Stanaj and more.

Production discography

Awards and nominations

Grammy Awards

References

External links
 
 
 
 
 
 

1982 births
Living people
African-American record producers
American hip hop record producers
Grammy Award winners
Musicians from Virginia Beach, Virginia
Southern hip hop musicians
African-American songwriters
Songwriters from Virginia
21st-century African-American people
20th-century African-American people